Michael D may refer to:

 Mike D (born 1965), founding member of the Beastie Boys

Arts
 Michael D. Cohen (actor) (born 1975), Canadian actor
 Michael D. Ellison, African American recording artist
 Michael D. Fay, American war artist
 Michael D. Ford (1928–2018), English set decorator
 Michael D. Roberts, American actor

Business
 Michael D. Dingman (1931–2017), American businessman
 Michael D. Ercolino (1906–1982), American businessman
 Michael D. Fascitelli, (born c. 1957), American businessman
 Michael D. Penner (born 1969), Canadian lawyer and businessman

Education
 Michael D. Aeschliman (born 1948), American–Swiss educator
 Michael D. Cohen (academic) (1945–2013), professor of complex systems, information and public policy at the University of Michigan
 Michael D. Hanes, American music educator
 Michael D. Hurley (born 1976), British Professor of Literature and Theology
 Michael D. Johnson, a former President of John Carroll University
 Michael D. Knox (born 1946), American antiwar activist and educator
 Michael D. Lockshin (born 1937), American professor and medical researcher
 Michael D. Ramsey (born 1964), American legal scholar

Historians
 Michael D. Behiels (born 1946), Canadian historian
 Michael D. Biddiss (born 1942), British historian
 Michael D. C. Drout (born 1968), American medievalist
 Michael D. Gordin (born 1974), American science historian

Journalism
 Michael D. Sallah, American journalist
 Michael D. Shear, American journalist
 Michael D. Sullivan, NPR correspondent

Legal
 Michael D. Brown (born 1954), American attorney
 Michael Cohen (lawyer) (Michael Dean Cohen), American disbarred lawyer, an attorney for U.S. president Donald Trump
 Michael D. Fricklas, American lawyer
 Michael D. Kohn (born 1954), American lawyer
 Michael D. O'Hara (1910–1978), American jurist
 Michael D. Ryan (1945–2012), American state supreme court justice
 Michael D. Sullivan (judge) (1938–2000)
 Michael D. Wilson, American state supreme court justice

Military
 Michael D. Barbero (born 1953), United States Army Lieutenant General
 Michael D. Haskins (born 1942), American vice admiral in the United States Navy
 Michael D. Healy (1926–2018), American General in the United States Army
 Michael D. Lumpkin (born 1964), American Naval Officer and businessman
 Michael D. Murphy, American lawyer and United States Air Force officer
 Michael D. Navrkal, American major general in the Army National Guard
 Michael D. Steele (born 1960), colonel of the United States Army
 Michael D. Stevens (born 1964), United States Navy sailor

Politics

American politicians
 Michael D. Antonovich (born 1939), American politician
 Michael D. Barnes (born 1943), American lawyer and politician
 Mike Bishop (politician) (born 1967), American politician
 Michael D. Bissonnette, American politician
 Michael D. Curran (born 1945), American politician
 Michael D. Duvall (born 1955), American politician
 Michael D. Harter (1846–1896), American politician
 Michael D. Hayes (born 1951), American politician
 Michael D. Jager (born 1968), American politician
 Michael D. MacDonald, American politician
 Michael D. Quill Sr. (born 1949), American politician
 Michael D. Smigiel Sr. (1958–2022), American politician
 Michael D. Unes (born 1974), American politician
 Michael D. White (1827–1917), American lawyer and politician

Other politicians
 Michael Bishop, Baron Glendonbrook (born 1942), British businessman and politician
 Michael D. Hassard (1817–1869), Irish politician
 Michael D. Higgins (born 1941), ninth President of Ireland
 Michael D. Lett (1938–2013), Grenadian politician

Religion
 Michael D. Jones (1822–1898), Welsh minister
 Michael D. Moore (evangelist)

Science

Natural sciences
 Michael D. Escobar, American biostatistician
 Michael D. Fayer (born 1947), American chemical physicist
 Michael D. Ferrero (born 1968), Australian botanist
 Michael D. Fox, American neurologist
 Michael D. Gershon (born 1938), American biologist
 Michael D. Griffin (born 1949), American physicist and aerospace engineer
 Michael D. Guiry (born 1949), Irish botanist
 Michael D. Reynolds (1954–2019), American astronomer
 Michael D. Swords, American biochemist and ufologist
 Michael D. Towler, British physicist
 Michael D. West (born 1953), American biogerontologist

Social sciences
 Michael D. Bordo (born 1942), Canadian and American economist
 Michael D. Coe (1929–2019), American archaeologist and author
 Michael D. Newcomb (1952–2010), American psychologist
 Michael D. Rhodes (born 1946), American Egyptologist
 Michael D. Robbins, American author and psychoanalyst
 Michael D. Rugg (born 1954), American psychologist
 Michael D. Smith (economist), American economist
 Michael D. Swaine (born 1951), American political scientist
 Michael D. Ward (1948–2021), American political scientist
 Michael D. Willis, British Indologist
 Michael D. Yapko, (born 1954), American psychologist and author

Formal sciences
 Michael D. Morley (1930–2020), American mathematician
 Michael D. Plummer (born 1937), American mathematician
 Michael D. Smith (computer scientist), American computer scientist
 Michael D. Fried, American mathematician

Other
 Mike Bishop (baseball) (1958–2005), Major League Baseball player
 Michael D. Leinbach (born c. 1953), American NASA Launch Director
 Michael D. Maltz (born 1938), American criminologist
 Michael D. Maples (born 1949), American Director of the Defense Intelligence Agency (DIA)
 Michael D. Metelits (born 1942), American ambassador
 Michael D. Ratchford (1860–1927), Irish-American labor leader
 Michael D. Watkins, Canadian author

See also